The Commission on Intergovernmental Relations (popularly known as the Kestnbaum Commission) was created by an act of the United States Congress on July 10, 1953, to make recommendations for the solution of problems involving federal and state governments. Its final report was issued on June 28, 1955.

At the time he made appointments to the Commission, President Eisenhower described it as "an historic undertaking: the elimination of frictions, duplications and waste from Federal-state relations; the clear definition of lines of Governmental authority in our nation; the increase in efficiency in a multitude of Governmental programs vital to the welfare of all Americans."

Controversy

The original chairman, Clarence Manion, was asked to resign in February 1954 by the White House, apparently over his advocacy of the Bricker Amendment to the U.S. Constitution.  He had also been criticized for frequent absences, and lecture tours attacking the Tennessee Valley Authority.  Meyer Kestnbaum was appointed to replace him in April.

Dudley White, Ohio newspaper publisher, who had been appointed executive director for the commission, resigned in protest over Manion's ouster; Noah M. Mason also resigned from the Commission.

Commission members

The commission had twenty-five members.  Fifteen were appointed by President Dwight D. Eisenhower, five by the Speaker of the House, and five by the President of the Senate.

Presidential appointees:

Clarence Manion, Chairman, until February 1954
Meyer Kestnbaum, Chairman, from April 1954
Gov. Alfred E. Driscoll, Vice-Chair
Prof. William Anderson
Lawrence A. Appley
Gov. John S. Battle
John E. Burton
Marion Bayard Folsom
Mayor Charles P. Henderson
Oveta Culp Hobby
Ex-Gov. Sam H. Jones
Clark Kerr
Alice K. Leopold
Val Peterson
Gov. Allan Shivers
Dan Thornton

U.S. Senate:
Sen. Alan Bible (filled vacancy)
Sen. John Marshall Butler (filled vacancy)
Sen. Guy Cordon (left office January, 1955)
Sen. Robert C. Hendrickson (left office January, 1955)
Sen. Clyde R. Hoey (died May 12, 1954)
Sen. Hubert H. Humphrey
Sen. Wayne L. Morse (filled vacancy)
Sen. Andrew F. Schoeppel

U.S. House:
Rep. John D. Dingell
Rep. James I. Dolliver
Rep. Brooks Hays
Rep. Angier Goodwin (filled vacancy)
Rep. Noah M. Mason (resigned February 18, 1954)
Rep. Harold C. Ostertag

References

Sources
 "10 Senators Join Panels: Nixon Names Them to Review Economic and Tax Policies," New York Times, August 8, 1953
 John Marshall Butler, The Commission on Intergovernmental Relations: A Report to the President for Transmittal to the Congress, Washington, DC., 1955.

External links
 Report of the Commission on Intergovernmental Relations
Records of Meyer Kestnbaum, Dwight D. Eisenhower Presidential Library
Records of the U.S. Commission on Intergovernmental Relations, 1953-1955, Dwight D. Eisenhower Presidential Library

Intergovernmental Relations
Presidency of Dwight D. Eisenhower